Deon Marie Hemmings (born 9 October 1968 in Saint Ann, Jamaica) is a former female 400 metres hurdler.

Hemmings was the first ever Jamaican woman to win an Olympic Gold when she won the 400m Hurdles at the 1996 Olympics breaking the Olympic record which stood to 2004. Hemmings also won two silver medals at the 2000 Olympics in the 400m Hurdles and 4 × 400 m Relay (together with Sandie Richards, Catherine Scott-Pomales and Lorraine Graham).

Hemmings also won a Silver medal in the 1994 Commonwealth Games, Bronze Medal in the 1995 World Athletics Championships, Silver in the 1997 World Athletics Championships and Bronze in the 1999 World Athletics Championships all in the 400m Hurdles.

Hemmings retired in 2003 and married Michael McCatty in 2004.

References

External links
 
 

1968 births
Living people
Jamaican female hurdlers
Athletes (track and field) at the 1991 Pan American Games
Athletes (track and field) at the 1992 Summer Olympics
Athletes (track and field) at the 1994 Commonwealth Games
Athletes (track and field) at the 1996 Summer Olympics
Athletes (track and field) at the 2000 Summer Olympics
Commonwealth Games silver medallists for Jamaica
Olympic athletes of Jamaica
Olympic gold medalists for Jamaica
Olympic silver medalists for Jamaica
People from Saint Ann Parish
Commonwealth Games medallists in athletics
Jamaican female sprinters
World Athletics Championships medalists
Medalists at the 2000 Summer Olympics
Medalists at the 1996 Summer Olympics
Olympic gold medalists in athletics (track and field)
Olympic silver medalists in athletics (track and field)
Pan American Games medalists in athletics (track and field)
Pan American Games silver medalists for Jamaica
Goodwill Games medalists in athletics
Central American and Caribbean Games gold medalists for Jamaica
Competitors at the 1998 Central American and Caribbean Games
World Athletics Indoor Championships winners
World Athletics Championships winners
Central American and Caribbean Games medalists in athletics
Competitors at the 1998 Goodwill Games
Medalists at the 1991 Pan American Games
20th-century Jamaican women
21st-century Jamaican women
Medallists at the 1994 Commonwealth Games